Rolyan is a small village in Bageshwar District, of Uttarakhand state in northern India. The village is in the eastern Kumaon region of Uttarakhand, The village is situated on the confluence of Gomati river.

There are many old temples dating back to tenth century. Narsingh Temple is situated at the across of the village just across confluence of Maigari State village. Shiva Temple is other important temple in the village.

As of 2011 India census, Rolyan Village had a total population of 475, consisting of 207 Males and 268 Females, spread across a total of 104 households.

School 

There is a primary school and also there is a middle school that was opened in 2011. Most of the students goes to G.I.C Maigari State College which is up to year 12.

Language 
Village residents speak Kumaoni language, 0.1% of residents speak Hindi or other languages.

Gallery

References 

 Raulyana, Population.
 Narsingh Temple
 Bageshwar
 Kumaoni Language
 Kumaoni Language
 Gomti River

Villages in Bageshwar district